Skúli Thoroddsen (6 January 1859 – 21 May 1916) was an Icelandic judge and politician.

Career 
Thoroddsen was a Speaker of the Althing.

Family 
He was married to poet Theodóra Thoroddsen. His great-granddaughter is Katrín Jakobsdóttir, the current Prime Minister of Iceland.

References 

1859 births
1916 deaths
Skuli Thoroddsen
Skuli Thorodssen